Jaanus Tasuja (also Gustav-Eduard Lorenz; 1 March 1896 Rägevere Parish, Virumaa – 19 October 1941 Kirov, Russia) was an Estonian politician. He was a member of III Riigikogu. He was a member of the Riigikogu since 16 May 1927. He replaced Heinrich Richard Kiiver.

References

1896 births
1941 deaths
Members of the Riigikogu, 1926–1929
Members of the Riigikogu, 1929–1932
Members of the Riigikogu, 1932–1934